Myanmar participated in the 2010 Asian Para Games–First Asian Para Games in Guangzhou, China, from 13 to 19 December 2010. Athletes from Myanmar won a single bronze medal and finished 30th in the medal table.

References

Nations at the 2010 Asian Para Games
2010 in Burmese sport
2010